Morris Blaine Peterson (March 26, 1906 – July 15, 1985) was a U.S. Representative from Utah.

Born in Ogden, Utah, Peterson's father was an immigrant from Norway. He attended the public schools and Weber College before graduating from the University of Utah in 1931 and from Georgetown Law School in 1938.
He was a law clerk to Justice Eugene E. Pratt of the Utah Supreme Court, and served as Weber County attorney.
He engaged in the private practice of law in 1941 and served in the Utah State legislature 1955-1957.
Peterson married M. Lucile Parry on May 18, 1932, and they had four children.

Peterson was elected as a Democrat to the Eighty-seventh Congress (January 3, 1961 – January 3, 1963) in an extremely close election against A. Walter Stevenson. Peterson won by just 68 votes.
He was an unsuccessful candidate for reelection in 1962 to the Eighty-eighth Congress.
He served as chairman of the Weber County, Utah, Taxpayers Association.
He served as special consultant to director of Food for Peace Program, 1963.
Having served as a young man in Leipzig, Germany, as a missionary for the Church of Jesus Christ of Latter-day Saints, Peterson later served as president of the Southern Germany Mission from 1970 to 1973.
He was a resident of Ogden until his death there July 15, 1985.
He was interred in Ogden City Cemetery.

References

External links

1906 births
1985 deaths
20th-century American politicians
20th-century Mormon missionaries
American people of Norwegian descent
American Mormon missionaries in Germany
Georgetown University Law Center alumni
Democratic Party members of the Utah House of Representatives
Politicians from Ogden, Utah
University of Utah alumni
Utah lawyers
Weber State University alumni
Democratic Party members of the United States House of Representatives from Utah
Latter Day Saints from Utah
20th-century American lawyers